The following is a list of albums, EPs, and mixtapes released in the first half of 2021. These albums are (1) original, i.e. excluding reissues, remasters, and compilations of previously released recordings, and (2) notable, defined as having received significant coverage from reliable sources independent of the subject.

For additional information about bands formed, reformed, disbanded, or on hiatus, for deaths of musicians, and for links to musical awards, see 2021 in music.

For information on albums released in the second half of 2021, see List of 2021 albums (July–December).

First quarter

January

February

March

Second quarter

April

May

June

References

 
Albums
2021 (January-June)